Giuseppe Rivola was an Italian painter of the Baroque period. He was a pupil of Filippo Abbiati, and died in 1740.

References

Italian Baroque painters
1740 deaths
Year of birth unknown
18th-century Italian painters
Italian male painters
18th-century Italian male artists